Coleophora tetraciliata is a moth of the family Coleophoridae. It is found in Lebanon, Iran and Turkey.

The wingspan is 14–16 mm.

References

tetraciliata
Moths of Asia
Moths described in 2007